Vukašin Jovanović (born 17 May 1996) is a Serbian professional footballer who plays as a centre-back for Cypriot club Apollon Limassol FC.

Club career

Red Star Belgrade
Jovanović first began playing competitive football in Red Star's youth system. He joined the first team under coach Slaviša Stojanovič in March 2014. He made his professional debut for Red Star Belgrade on 9 August 2014, under coach Nenad Lalatović, when he came on the field as a substitute for Darko Lazić in a match against Radnički Niš. He signed his first professional contract on 12 August 2014, a couple of days after his official debut.

Zenit
On 20 February 2016, Jovanović signed with Russian club Zenit Saint Petersburg, reportedly on a 4.5-year contract. Although he trained with Zenit's first team, Jovanović played only for Zenit's reserves.

Bordeaux
On 31 January 2017, he joined the French club Bordeaux on loan until the end of the 2016–17 season. He played nine games during the loan, and at the end of the season Bordeaux decided to purchase him for approximately €3 million.

International career
Jovanović began playing for the national selections at the U-17 and U-18 categories. He was called up by Serbia youth coach Veljko Paunović for the 2014 UEFA European Under-19 Championship. In the tournament, he first played in Srđan Babić's place due to his card suspension, but later he played all four matches. Subsequently, Jovanović played for Serbia's U20 squad which won the 2015 FIFA U20 World Cup in New Zealand.

Career statistics

Honours
Serbia
 FIFA U-20 World Cup: 2015

References

External links
 
 Vukašin Jovanović profile at Fudbalski savez Srbije
 
 
 
 Vukašin Jovanović stats at utakmica.rs 
 

1996 births
Living people
Footballers from Belgrade
Association football defenders
Serbian footballers
Serbia youth international footballers
Serbia under-21 international footballers
Red Star Belgrade footballers
FC Zenit Saint Petersburg players
FC Zenit-2 Saint Petersburg players
Serbian SuperLiga players
FC Girondins de Bordeaux players
Ligue 1 players
Apollon Limassol FC players
Cypriot First Division players
Serbian expatriate footballers
Serbian expatriate sportspeople in Russia
Expatriate footballers in Russia
Serbian expatriate sportspeople in France
Expatriate footballers in France
Serbian expatriate sportspeople in Cyprus
Expatriate footballers in Cyprus